Popular Tales of the West Highlands is a four-volume collection of fairy tales, collected and published by John Francis Campbell, and often translated from Gaelic. Alexander Carmichael was one of the main contributors. The collection in four volumes was first published in 1860–62 in Edinburgh. A new edition (with different pagination) appeared under the auspices of the Islay Association in 1890–93.
Campbell dedicated the work in 1860 to the son of my Chief, the Marquess of Lorne.

Volume IV, subtitled "Postscript", contained miscellany. The greater part of it was devoted to commentary on the Ossian controversy, the rest filled with descriptions of traditional costume, music, and lore on supernatural beings. More West Highland Tales (1940) was later published, provided with translations by John Gunn McKay.

Fairy tales

Volume I
The Young King Of Easaidh Ruadh
The Battle of the Birds
The Tale of the Hoodie
The Sea-Maiden
Conall Cra Bhuidhe
The Tale of Conal Crovi
The Tale of Connal
Murchag a's Mionachag
The Brown Bear of the Green Glen
The Three Soldiers
The Story of the White Pet
The Daughter of the Skies
The Girl and the Dead Man
The King who Wished to Marry His Daughter
The Poor Brother and the Rich
The King Of Lochlin's Three Daughters
Maol a Chliobain
Fables
 Bailie Lunnain
The Slim Swarthy Champion
The History of the Ceabharnach
The Tale of the Shifty Lad, the Widow's Son

Volume II
The Chest
The Inheritance
The Three Wise Men
A Puzzle
The Ridere (Knight) Of Riddles
The Burgh
The Tulman
The Isle of Pabaidh
Sanntraigh
Cailliach Mhor Chlibhrich
The Smith and the Fairies
Kirkcudbright
Sutherland
Badenoch
Ross
Bearnairidh
Isle of Man
Devonshire
Conclusion: Fairy Beliefs
The Fine
The Two Shepherds
Osean After the Feen
The Barra Widow's Son
The Tale of the Queen Who Sought a Drink From a Certain Well
The Origin of Loch Ness
Conall
Maghach Colgar
The Brollachan
Murachadh Mac Brian
The Three Widows
The Son of the Scottish Yeoman who Stole the Bishop's Horse and Daughter, and the Bishop Himself
The Widow and her Daughters
The Tale of the Soldier
The Sharp Grey Sheep
The Widow's Son
Mac-a-Rusgaich
MacIain Direach
Fearachur Leigh
The Tale of Sgire Mo Chealag
The Cat and the Mouse
The Three Questions
The Fair Gruagach, Son of the King of Eirinn
The Knight of the Red Shield
The Tail

Volume III
The Rider Of Grianaig, And Iain The Soldier's Son.
Fionn's Questions.
Diarmaid And Grainne
The Lay of Diarmaid
The Story of the Lay of Diarmaid, No. 1
The Lay of Diarmaid, No. 2
The Lay of Yeearmaid. No. 3
The Lay of Diarmaid, No. 4
Fables
How the Fox Took a Turn Out of the Goat
How the Cock Took a Turn Out of the Fox
The Hen
The Keg of Butter
The Fox and the Little Bonnach
Caol Reidhinn. Why the Name was Given to it
 Thomas of the Thumb.
The Bulls.
The Hoodie Catechising the Young One
The Hoodie and the Fox
The Yellow Muilearteach
The Story of the Lay of the Great Fool
The Lay of the Great Fool
Guaigean Ladhrach 'S Loirean Spagach
Conall Gulban; or Guilbeinach, or Gulbairneach
Introduction
The Story of Conall Gulban
Story of the King of Spain.
The Story of Conall Gulban (Part II)
John, Son of the King of Bergen
The Master and his Man.
The Praise of Goll
Osgar, the Son of Oisein
The Lay of Osgar
 How the Een was Set Up
The Reason Why the Dallag (Dog-Fish) is Called the King's Fish
The Lay of Magnus
 Manus
The Song of the Smithy
Duan Na Ceardach
Nighean Righ Fo Thuinn. The Daughter Of King Under-Waves

Volume IV
 Postscript
 I. Ossian, Points for Argument, Statement of the Case, Current Opinions-- English; Scotch; Irish; Irish Arguments Considered, Lowland Scotch
 Authorities—Heroes of Ossian, References to Fenian and other Traditions, and to Ossianic Heroes and Poems in Old Writings, chronologically arranged. 
 Published Evidence and Books
 Popular Ballads
 Current Gaelic Traditions
 Internal Evidence
 Essay on Gaelic Poetry by H. MacNair
 Letter from John Dewar
 Letter from D. K. Torrie
 Letter from Archibald Sinclair 
 Letter from Alexander Carmichael
 Conclusion
 Ossianic Proverbs and Family History
 II. Traditions—British Traditions
 Welsh Stories, etc., compared with Gaelic
 III. Mythology—Aryan Theory
 West Highland Stories
 Supernatural History—Water-Bulls, and Water-Horses, Boobries, Dragons, Fairies, etc. 
 Icelandic Saga
 IV. A Plea for Gaelic
 List of Sanscrit words, Topography, Some words common to Gaelic and English, Other Languages, Saxon
 V. Highland Dress
 VI. Celtic Art and its probable origin
 VII. Music
 Conclusion
 List of Ballads orally collected
 References to Printed Ballads 
 List of Stories Collected
 Index

References

Bibliography

Vol. I; Vol. II (1860); Vol. III (1862);  Vol. IV (1862)
Vol. III (1862); Vol. IV (1862) (Google)

Vol.II (1890); Vol. II (1890); Vol. III (1892); Vol. IV (1893) (Internet Archive)
Vol. II (1890) Vol. IV (1893) (Google)
;

Vol. 1; Vol. 2 (snippet)

External links

National Library of Scotland's "Early Gaelic Book Collections" online
 (Blair collection) Popular Tales Edinburgh, 1860–62 (Vol. I-IV)
 Popular Tales Edinburgh, 1860–62 deluxe-bound (Vol. I-IV)
Sacred-texts site (omits Gaelic text, etc.)
Volume I
Volume II
Volume III
Volume IV
 Electric Scotland site with Gaelic versions

Collections of fairy tales
European mythology